The Prairie Gold Lacrosse League, formally known as the Saskatchewan Major Box Lacrosse League (2001–2003), is a Junior B box lacrosse league in Saskatchewan, Canada.

A formal Senior division was launched in 2005, presently with seven member teams.

History 
2016 Senior league champion Saskatoon Brewers became the first-ever PGLL team to compete in a Canadian Lacrosse Association national tournament. Brewers traveled to Leduc, Alberta to compete at Presidents Cup.

Expansion followed in 2017 with three new teams added in the senior division (Prince Albert Outlaws, Saskatoon Steelers, Saskatoon SWAT). A fourth Saskatoon team, the Plainsmen, were added before the 2018 season.

For the 2018 season the Regina Rifles and Regina Riot programs merged to form the Regina Rampage. The program dissolved after one year and the Rifles returned in 2019.

Teams 

Former Junior teams
 Assinboia Attack (2001–2011)
 Big River Bulldogs (2001–2003)
 Big River Extreme (2003–2006)
 Estevan Big Dogs (2013; 2018–19) - on hiatus for 2022
 Moose Jaw Jr. Mustangs (2002–2013; 2016–17)
 Regina Jr. Heat (2001–2006)
Regina Rifles (2010–2017; 2019) - combined with Riot to form Regina Rampage in 2018
Regina Riot (2011–2017)
 Saskatoon Smash (2001–2014)
 Saskatoon Steelers (2005–2014)
 Swift Current Rampage (2003–2009)
 Yorkton Bulldogs (2003–2014)

Former Senior teams
 Assiniboia Sr. Attack (2011)
 Estevan Impact (2013–2019) - on hiatus for 2022
 Meewasin Valley Plainsmen (2018–19) - on hiatus for 2022
 Saskatoon Minotaurs (2012)

League champions

Team records

Individual records

Year-by-year review

2001 season
The Saskatchewan Major Box Lacrosse League was formed in May 2001 with the Assiniboia Attack, Big River Bulldogs, Regina Heat and Saskatoon Smash. The Saskatoon Smash took the first year's regular season league title by going undefeated. No playoffs were held.

2002 season
The league added the Moose Jaw Mustangs team and the Mustangs did not disappoint, not losing a game all year to capture the first-ever official PGLL Provincial title by defeating the Saskatoon Smash in the final. Ken Stewart was named 2002 Saskatchewan Lacrosse Association Player of the Year.

2003 season
The 2003 season was a huge success with the final game summarizing just how exciting this league is and will become even more so in the future as the developing teams become more competitive.  The Moose Jaw Mustangs once again captured the league championship with a thrilling overtime victory over the Saskatoon Smash. The season saw large growth in the number of teams with the Prince Albert Predators, Swift Current Rampage, Yorkton Bulldogs and the first senior team, Regina Heat, entering the league.

The Saskatchewan Major Box Lacrosse League changed the name of the league to the Prairie Gold Lacrosse League at the AGM held on December 15, 2003.

2004 season
The 2004 season was another great season for the PGLL, including the first season of tiered Junior lacrosse. The Tier 1 title was once again won by the Moose Jaw Mustangs, although the team did lose its first ever game in the league. Moose Jaw dropped a game to the Yorkton Bulldogs in the best-of three final series. The Tier 2 title was also won by Moose Jaw Mustangs II, showing this program has a strong contingent of players ready to keep the Mustangs near the top of the PGLL for years to come.

2005 season
2005 was a history-making season with Saskatoon hosting the Founders Cup for the first time in Saskatchewan's history. The Moose Jaw Mustangs kept their Tier 1 championship streak alive, defeating the Saskatoon Smash in the final series. The Tier 2 championship was won by the Saskatoon Steelers.

The Regina Heat captured the first-ever PGLL Senior title with a win over the expansion Saskatoon Brewers.

2006 season
The Moose Jaw Mustangs won their fifth-straight championship, defeating the Saskatoon Smash in the final series. The Tier 2 championship was won once again by the Saskatoon Steelers, showing the upcoming depth of the Saskatoon program.

Regina Heat captured their second consecutive Senior title with a win over the Saskatoon Brewers.

2008 season
Saskatoon Smash finished the regular season first and went undefeated in the playoffs to win the Tier 1 Junior championship. Yorkton Bulldogs had a slow start to the season, but finished it off with their first Tier 2 Junior championship. Other teams with successful seasons were the Regina Riot, Saskatoon Steelers and the Prince Albert Predators.

References

External links 
 PGLL website
 

Sport in Saskatchewan
Lacrosse leagues in Canada